Santiago Gabriel Camacho (born 25 January 1997) is an Argentine professional footballer who plays as a midfielder for Chilean club Deportes Temuco on loan from Estudiantes de Buenos Aires.

Career
San Lorenzo signed Camacho to their youth system in 2004 from Club González Catán. His first-team career got underway in 2017. He joined Independiente Rivadavia in Primera B Nacional on loan in September 2017, making the first of three appearances during 2017–18 against Ferro Carril Oeste on 24 November.

Career statistics
.

References

External links

1997 births
Living people
Footballers from Buenos Aires
Argentine footballers
Argentine expatriate footballers
Association football midfielders
Argentine Primera División players
Primera Nacional players
Paraguayan Primera División players
Primera B Metropolitana players
Primera B de Chile players
San Lorenzo de Almagro footballers
Independiente Rivadavia footballers
River Plate (Asunción) footballers
Club Atlético Fénix players
Club Atlético Colegiales (Argentina) players
Estudiantes de Buenos Aires footballers
Deportes Temuco footballers
Argentine expatriate sportspeople in Paraguay
Expatriate footballers in Paraguay
Argentine expatriate sportspeople in Chile
Expatriate footballers in Chile